= Pretty Is =

Debut novel by Maggie Mitchell

- Author: Maggie Mitchell
- Language: English
- Publisher: Henry Holt and Co.
- Publication date: 2015
- ISBN: 978-1250093622

Pretty Is is a 2015 psychological-thriller novel by Maggie Mitchell. It tells the story of two girls who bonded with their kidnapper, and their experiences after being rescued.

== Publication ==
The novel was released in the United States on 7 July 2015 by Henry Holt and Company. UK paperback followed from Orion in April 2016.

== See also ==
- Psychological thriller
